Gerosa is a surname. Notable people with the surname include:

Augusto Gerosa (1909-?), Italian ice hockey player
Carlo Gerosa (born 1964), Italian alpine skier 
Gaston Gerosa (born 1923), Swiss cyclist
Lawrence E. Gerosa (1894–1972), Italian-born American politician
Mario Gerosa (born 1967), Argentine-born Italian rugby union player
Mauro Gerosa (born 1974), Italian racing cyclist
Vincenza Gerosa (1784–1847), Italian Roman Catholic nun